Joseph-Philippe Guay,  (October 4, 1915 – July 30, 2001) was a Canadian parliamentarian, serving as a member of the Liberal Party.

Born in St. Vital, Manitoba, Guay was an alderman and mayor of Saint-Boniface, Manitoba before turning to federal politics.  He won the St. Boniface Liberal nomination in the buildup to the 1968 federal election over the sitting member, cabinet minister Roger-Joseph Teillet.  Guay campaigned on the fact that he, unlike Teillet, had supported Pierre Elliott Trudeau on every ballot of the 1968 Liberal Party of Canada leadership convention.  He was returned in the general election, and was re-elected in 1972 and 1974.

He held numerous parliamentary functions including: Parliamentary Secretary to the Minister of Transport (1972–1974), Parliamentary Secretary to the Minister of Regional Economic Expansion (1974–1975), Chief Government Whip (1975–1977), Minister of State (Multiculturalism) (1977), Minister without Portfolio (1976–1977), and Minister of National Revenue (1977–1978).

In 1978, he was appointed to the Senate representing the senatorial division of St. Boniface, Manitoba. He retired on his 75th birthday in 1990.

In 1957, he was knighted as a member of the Order of Saint Gregory the Great by Pope Pius XII.

Electoral history

References

External links
 

1915 births
2001 deaths
Canadian senators from Manitoba
Franco-Manitoban people
Liberal Party of Canada MPs
Liberal Party of Canada senators
Mayors of Saint Boniface, Winnipeg
Members of the House of Commons of Canada from Manitoba
Members of the King's Privy Council for Canada